The 1953 Paris–Roubaix was the 51st edition of the Paris–Roubaix, a classic one-day cycle race in France. The single day event was held on 12 April 1953 and stretched  from Paris to the finish at Roubaix Velodrome. The winner was Germain Derycke from Belgium.

Results

References

1953
1953 in road cycling
1953 in French sport
1953 Challenge Desgrange-Colombo
April 1953 sports events in Europe